Hamada al-Omar  is a Syrian village located in the Uqayribat Subdistrict of the Salamiyah District in the Hama Governorate. According to the Syria Central Bureau of Statistics (CBS), Hamada al-Omar had a population of 2,056 in the 2004 census. Its inhabitants are largely Sunni Muslims whose forebears converted from Ismaili Shia Islam.

Syrian Civil War 

On 20 February 2022, 3 Syrian army soldiers loyal to Bashar al-Assad were killed and another was injured after a landmine, planted by ISIL operatives, exploded near the town.

References 

Populated places in Salamiyah District